The Drones World Tour was a worldwide concert tour by the English rock band Muse. Staged in support of the band's 2015 album Drones, the tour visited arenas and festivals throughout 2015 and is the tenth concert tour the band has carried out. It began on 23 May 2015 in Norwich, England at the BBC Radio 1's Big Weekend. The tour has grossed $23M from 34 shows in 2015, plus $65.5M from 64 shows in 2016.

A live video of the tour entitled Muse: Drones World Tour, was released in cinemas worldwide on 12 July 2018.

Rehearsals 
Rehearsals for the Drones festival tour took part in late April and were held in Air Studios, where Muse previously rehearsed for the Origin of Symmetry anniversary concerts at Reading and Leeds festivals, and where Muse also recorded Absolution and parts of The 2nd Law, Drones and Simulation Theory.

European Festivals 
Muse played various festivals around Europe on the first leg of the tour, which started 23 May 2015. This leg of the tour also included Muse's debut performance at Download Festival, which they also headlined.

The second leg of the European Festivals tour began on 24 June 2016 at Glastonbury. The new stage set up featured 11 LED pillars which could be manually pushed back and forth by members of the crew to accommodate the show. Bellamy compared this set up to The Resistance tour on his Instagram. An updated version of this set was used for the remaining dates in 2017, complete with new lighting rigs and lasers.

Drones Arena Tour

Matt Bellamy confirmed that Muse would be tour North America in late 2015, and Europe in 2016. The stage setup is an 'in-the-round' setup, with a circular stage in the middle, similar to U2's 360 Tour, with catwalks on either end of the stage. Bellamy has also said that they will be flying drones over the audience during the shows. This set up was first used on 17 November 2015 in Mexico City at the start of the band's North America tour. The Arena tour dates prior in South America and Asia the band used their festival production.

The show begins with spherical drones being launched from a space station-style grid at the top of arenas, and they later re-appear during the course of the concert. There are also retractable video screens using projection, a spherical 360 screen over the main central stage, and a giant inflatable device designed to look like a Reaper drone. Confetti and streamers were also shot into the audience during performances of "Mercy".

However, the show has had technical difficulties. Two concerts in San Diego & Las Vegas were rescheduled due to "technical and logistical" challenges, while the drones were not used at all in three gigs, and one gig in Detroit saw several drones fail simultaneously.

Tour dates

Cancelled shows

Notes

References

External links 
 
 Muse Official Website

2015 concert tours
2016 concert tours
Muse (band) concert tours